George Brent (born George Brendan Nolan; 15 March 1904 – 26 May 1979) was an Irish-American stage, film, and television actor. He is best remembered for the eleven films he made with Bette Davis, which included Jezebel and Dark Victory.

Early life
Brent was born in Ballinasloe, County Galway, Ireland on March 15, 1904, to John J.  and Mary (née McGuinness) Nolan. His father was a shopkeeper and his mother was a native of Clonfad, Moore, County Roscommon. In September 1915, he moved with his younger sister Kathleen to New York City. There, they joined their mother, who was living in the USA after her separation from her husband.

Brent returned to Ireland in February 1921, during the Irish War of Independence (1919–1922), and was involved in the Irish Republican Army. During this period he also became involved with the Abbey Theatre.

He fled Ireland with a bounty set on his head by the British government, although he later claimed only to have been a courier for guerrilla leader and tactician Michael Collins. According to Ballinasloe Life (volume 2, issue 4, Oct/Nov 2012),  the Irish War of Independence careers of three different men named George Nolan (Brent and two others; one from County Dublin and the other from County Offaly) were apparently conflated, which may explain some of the discrepancies regarding Brent's year of birth, life, and activities during the 1919 to 1922 period.

Career

American stage career
Brent travelled from England to Canada and returned to the United States in August 1921.<ref>George Brent - Ireland's Gift to Hollywood and its Leading Ladies (2014) by Scott O'Brien</ref>

He decided to become a professional actor. He made his Broadway debut in director Guthrie McClintic’s The Dover Road. He did numerous plays throughout the 1920s, including running several of his own stock companies. He appeared in productions of Abie's Irish Rose (on tour for two years), Stella Dallas, Up in Mabel's Room, Elmer the Great, Seventh Heaven, White Cargo and Lilac Time. He acted in stock companies at Elitch Theatre, in Denver, Colorado (1929), as well as Rhode Island, Florida, and Massachusetts. In 1930, he appeared on Broadway in Love, Honor, and Betray, alongside Clark Gable.George BRENT: HIS TRAVELS
Picture Show; London Vol. 27, Iss. 701,  (Oct 8, 1932): 18.

Early films: Fox and Universal
Brent moved to Hollywood and made his first film for 20th Century Fox, Under Suspicion (1930).Cozad, W. Lee. (2002). Those Magnificent Mountain Movies: (The Golden Years) 1911-1939, p. 160. Lake Arrowhead, CA: Rim of the World Historic Society.  He continued in supporting roles for Fox in Once a Sinner (1931), Fair Warning (1931), and Charlie Chan Carries On (1931).

At Universal he was seventh-billed for Ex-Bad Boy (1931) and fifth for The Homicide Squad (1931), then was in the Rin Tin Tin serial The Lightning Warrior (1931) at Mascot Pictures.

Warner Bros.
Brent was signed by Warner Bros. in 1931, where he played Barbara Stanwyck's leading man in So Big! (1932), establishing him as a leading man. Bette Davis had a small role.

Brent appeared in The Rich Are Always with Us (1932) with Ruth Chatterton (who became his second wife that year), in which Davis again had a supporting role.

It was followed by Week-End Marriage (1932) with Loretta Young, The Purchase Price (1932) with Stanwyck, Miss Pinkerton (1932) with Joan Blondell, The Crash (1932) with Chatterton, and They Call It Sin (1932) with Young.

Paramount borrowed Brent for the leading-man role in Luxury Liner (1933). Back at Warners, he was one of several studio names  in 42nd Street (1933), playing the lover of Bebe Daniels.

He returned to supporting female stars: Kay Francis in The Keyhole (1933), Chatterton in both Lilly Turner (1933) and Female (1933), and Stanwyck in Baby Face (1933).

In October 1933, he and Chatterton refused to make a film they had been assigned, Mandalay, and were replaced by Lyle Talbot and Kay Francis. Brent's salary was then $1,000 a week.

He was top-billed in From Headquarters (1933) with Margaret Lindsay; then MGM borrowed him to play Myrna Loy's leading man in Stamboul Quest (1934). In September 1934, Chatteron filed for divorce.

Notable Roles
Brent was top billed in Housewife (1934) with Bette Davis, who was his co star. He was leading man to Jean Muir in Desirable (1935) then MGM used him for The Painted Veil (1934) with Greta Garbo.

Brent supported Josephine Hutchinson in The Right to Live (1935), Francis in Living on Velvet (1935) and Stranded (1935). He then made two films with Davis, where she was top billed: Front Page Woman (1935) and Special Agent (1935).

Brent appeared in The Goose and the Gander (1935) with Kay Francis, then was borrowed by RKO to make In Person (1935) with Ginger Rogers. At Warners he was top billed in the comedy Snowed Under (1936), then Walter Wanger borrowed him to play Madeleine Carroll's leading man in The Case Against Mrs. Ames (1936).

At Warners he was reunited with Davis in The Golden Arrow (1936) and Francis in Give Me Your Heart (1936). Columbia borrowed him to support Jean Arthur in More Than a Secretary (1936) then Warners gave him top billing in God's Country and the Woman (1936) with Margaret Lindsay.

Brent made Mountain Justice (1937) with Hutchinson and The Go Getter (1937) with Anita Louise. Warners then put Brent in his first male-orientated movie: Submarine D-1 (1937) with Pat O'Brien and Wayne Morris. In November 1937 he became an American citizen.

Brent made Gold Is Where You Find It (1938) with Olivia de Havilland, then made Jezebel (1938) with Davis - only he was the second male lead, with Henry Fonda playing Davis' main love interest.

Warners put him in an action "B" film with Humphrey Bogart, Racket Busters (1938) then he was reunited with Francis in Secrets of an Actress (1938). He was in the military drama Wings of the Navy (1939) with de Havilland and John Payne.

He appeared in Dark Victory (1939) with Davis, which was a huge success. So too was The Old Maid (1939) where Davis and Miriam Hopkins fought over Brent. Both films were directed by Edmund Goulding.

20th Century Fox borrowed Brent for a key support role in The Rains Came (1939). At Warners he supported James Cagney and O'Brien in The Fighting 69th (1940).

Paramount borrowed him for Adventure in Diamonds (1940), where he had top billing over Isa Miranda. He was Merle Oberon's leading man in 'Til We Meet Again (1940), then starred in The Man Who Talked Too Much (1940) and South of Suez (1940). He supported Ann Sheridan in Honeymoon for Three (1941) and Davis in The Great Lie (1941).

Columbia borrowed him for the lead role in They Dare Not Love (1941) with Martha Scott and Edward Small used him in two films, International Lady (1941) with Ilona Massey and Twin Beds (1942) with Joan Bennett.

Brent made one final film with Davis, In This Our Life (1942), alongside de Havilland. He supported Stanwyck in The Gay Sisters (1942) and was top-billed in You Can't Escape Forever (1942) with Brenda Marshall and Silver Queen (1942) with Priscilla Lane.

Military service
In 1942, Brent, an accomplished pilot who had tried and, because of age, failed to enlist in the armed services, temporarily retired from films to teach flying as a civilian flight instructor with the Civilian Pilot Training Program, and later became a pilot in the US Coast Guard for the duration of the war.

His final film for Warner Bros. was My Reputation with Barbara Stanwyck, filmed from November 1943 to January 1944; except for previews for military audiences, it was not released until 1946. Brent acted on radio during this period.

Freelance actor
While Brent returned to his acting career after WWII, he never recaptured his former popularity but during the immediate post war period he still remained a star of big budget films. RKO used him as Hedy Lamarr's leading man in Experiment Perilous (1944). For Hal Wallis he did The Affairs of Susan (1945) with Joan Fontaine then Tomorrow Is Forever (1946) at International with Claudette Colbert and Orson Welles.

He returned to RKO for The Spiral Staircase (1946), a huge success. At Universal he was teamed with Lucille Ball in Lover Come Back (1946), then he made Temptation (1946) with Oberon and Edward Small at International.

Brent went to Eagle Lion to make a comedy Out of the Blue (1947) and Columbia for The Corpse Came C.O.D. (1947) with Blondell. Universal teamed him with Yvonne De Carlo in Slave Girl (1947).

Brent was one of several names in Christmas Eve (1947) for Benedict Bogeaus and Luxury Liner (1948) at MGM, a remake of the 1933 film in which Brent had appeared.

He went to Republic to star in Angel on the Amazon (1948) and in Universal's Red Canyon (1949) played the father of the star, Ann Blyth. At the same studio he was third lead in Illegal Entry (1949) then had the lead in a "B" The Kid from Cleveland (1949). He supported Colbert in Bride for Sale (1950) at RKO.

The budgets of Brent's films continued to shrink. He did two for Lippert Pictures: F.B.I. Girl (1951) and The Last Page (1952), the latter shot in England with Diana Dors. There was  Montana Belle (1952) with Jane Russell then two for Monogram: Tangier Incident (1953) and Mexican Manhunt (1953).

Television
Brent moved into television in the early 1950s guest starring in The Revlon Mirror Theater, Crown Theatre with Gloria Swanson, The Ford Television Theatre, Climax!, Fireside Theatre, Stage 7, Studio 57, Science Fiction Theatre, Celebrity Playhouse, Schlitz Playhouse and the religion anthology series, Crossroads.

He was cast in the lead in the 1956 television series Wire Service, which ran for 39 performances.

After appearing on Rawhide and The Chevy Mystery Show, Brent retired.

In 1978, he made one last film, the made-for-television production Born Again''.

In 1960, Brent was inducted into the Hollywood Walk of Fame with two stars. He received a motion-pictures star located at 1709 Vine Street and a second star located at 1612 Vine Street for his work in television.

Personal life
Brent was married five times: to Helen Louise Campbell (1925–1927), Ruth Chatterton (1932–1934), Constance Worth (1937), Ann Sheridan (1942–1943), and Janet Michaels (1947–1974). Chatterton, Worth, and Sheridan were actresses; Chatterton and Sheridan were Warner Bros. players.

His final marriage to Janet Michaels, a former model and dress designer, lasted 27 years until her death in 1974. They had two children: a daughter, Suzanne (born August 3, 1950), and a son, Barry (born November 26, 1954).

Brent also had affairs with actresses Greta Garbo and Bette Davis, the latter a frequent Warner Bros. co-star.

He suffered from emphysema and died of natural causes in 1979 in Solana Beach, California.

Filmography

Feature films

Short subjects

Radio appearances

References

External links
 
 
 
 Photographs and literature

1904 births
1979 deaths
American male film actors
American male stage actors
American male television actors
Deaths from emphysema
Irish emigrants to the United States (before 1923)
Irish male film actors
Irish male stage actors
Irish male television actors
Irish Republican Army (1919–1922) members
People from Ballinasloe
20th-century American male actors
Warner Bros. contract players
20th-century Irish male actors
Age controversies